The Lithograph City Formation is a geologic formation in Iowa, part of the Cedar Valley Group. It preserves fossils dating back to the Devonian period.  The formation is composed of dolomite and limestone, with many fossils and vugs in the lower part, while the upper part contains few fossils.

The formation is named after exposures in the former company town of Lithograph City, where quarries were opened to exploit the high-quality lithographic limestone found in parts of this formation.

See also

 List of fossiliferous stratigraphic units in Iowa
 Paleontology in Iowa

References

Devonian Iowa
Devonian southern paleotemperate deposits